Walter Carruthers Sellar (27 December 1898 – 11 June 1951) was a Scottish humourist who wrote for Punch. He is best known for the 1930 book 1066 and All That, a tongue-in-cheek guide to "all the history you can remember," which he wrote together with R. J. Yeatman.

Early life
Sellar was born at Golspie in Sutherland, the descendant of Patrick Sellar who had taken a leading role in the Highland clearances and a relative of William Young Sellar, a Scottish classical scholar.

He won a scholarship to Fettes College where he was Head Boy in 1917. After serving briefly in World War I as a second lieutenant in the King's Own Scottish Borderers, he took a degree in modern history at Oriel College, Oxford (which, as recorded in 1066 and All That, was awarded through an aegrotat in 1922).

It was at Oriel that he met his contemporary Yeatman, and struck up a lifelong friendship. Although the two produced brilliant work together, they were entirely different personalities: Sellar was somewhat shy and introverted, although he enjoyed acting. He wrote melancholy poetry in addition to dry humour.

Teaching career
On leaving Oriel, Sellar worked as a schoolmaster at his old school Fettes, leaving in 1928 when he moved to Great Marlow in Buckinghamshire in the hope of becoming a full-time writer.

However, the financial burdens of bringing up two daughters led him to take a job at Canford School in Dorset from the start of the school year in 1929, and he went on to teach at Charterhouse School from 1932 until his death. At first he taught history, but later moved to teach English and he became Housemaster of Daviesites from 1939. He used his own ration and money to buy extra food for the boys of the House during World War II, which made him very popular.

During the period 1946-1950 he was again teaching history at Charterhouse, and even in his late years Sellar retained his sense of humour, for example putting on as the school play one year two trials.  The first, in which he was somehow simultaneously the King of Spain and the Lord Chief Justice of England, was the trial of Christopher Columbus (played by the Head Boy) for the heinous crime of discovering America.  The second, in his words "the most important negligence trial in history" was of course the trial of Guy Fawkes "in that he did fail to blow up the Houses of Parliament".  The boys (Charterhouse was all-male in those days) all loved this (and also his habit of throwing blackboard rubbers at the headmaster!).

Writing
Sellar had begun to contribute to Punch in 1925 when three humorous short stories of his were published (he also contributed to other journals around this time). His collaboration with his old University colleague Yeatman, who was also writing for Punch, appears to have begun in 1928 during his period out of teaching. The first part of 1066 and All That appeared in Punch on 10 September 1930, taking its title from Robert Graves' autobiography Good-Bye to All That. Sellar's contribution is particularly noted in the comic exaggerations and name confusions; his knowledge of English literature also inspired the book's many literary allusions and pastiches.

After completing the book, Sellar worked with Yeatman again on a sequel, And Now All This, a parody of general knowledge, including subjects as diverse as geography, knitting and topology.

The 1933 book Horse Nonsense was credited to the two but is largely the work of Yeatman, while Garden Rubbish and other Country Bumps is also credited to the two but largely Sellar's work.

Publications
 1066 and All That (1930) 
 And Now All This (1932) 
 Horse Nonsense (1933) 
 Garden Rubbish and other Country Bumps (1936)

References

Further reading
 W. C. Purdue, "Speaking Volumes: W.C. Sellar's and R.J. Yeatman's 1066 and All That", The Times Higher Education Supplement, 29 August 1997. Retrieved 17 April 2017.

British parodists
Parody novelists
1898 births
1951 deaths
Anglo-Scots
People from Sutherland
People educated at Fettes College
King's Own Scottish Borderers officers
Scottish humorists
Alumni of Oriel College, Oxford
British Army personnel of World War I